Saad Suhail Juma al-Mukhaini (born 6 September 1987), commonly known as Saad Suhail, is an Omani professional footballer who plays for Sohar in the Oman Professional League.

Club career
In 2006, he signed with Al-Oruba. In 2010, he moved to Al-Suwaiq where he played for one season before signing for Fanja. In January 2012, it was confirmed that he was given a trial by Arsenal. In 2012, he signed for Dhofar. In 2013, he came back to Fanja and then to Al-Oruba on 13 July 2014.

Club career statistics

International career
Saad is part of the first team squad of the Oman national football team. He was selected for the national team for the first time in 2009. He made his first appearance for Oman on 9 June 2009 in a friendly match against Bosnia and Herzegovina. He has made appearances in the 2009 Gulf Cup of Nations, the 2010 Gulf Cup of Nations, the 2011 AFC Asian Cup qualification, the 2014 FIFA World Cup qualification, the 2013 Gulf Cup of Nations and the 2015 AFC Asian Cup qualification.

National team career statistics

International caps

Goals for Senior National Team
Scores and results list Oman's goal tally first.

Honours

Club
With Al-Oruba
Oman Professional League (1): 2014–15
Sultan Qaboos Cup (2): 2010, 2014-15
Omani Super Cup (1): 2008

With Al-Suwaiq
Omani League (1): 2010–11
Oman Super Cup (0): Runner-up 2010

With Fanja
Omani League (1): 2011–12
Sultan Qaboos Cup (1): 2013
Oman Super Cup (0): Runner-Up 2013

With Dhofar
Oman Super Cup (0): Runner-Up 2012

See also
 List of men's footballers with 100 or more international caps

References

External links

Saad Suhail at Goal.com

1987 births
Living people
People from Sur, Oman
Omani footballers
Oman international footballers
Association football fullbacks
Al-Orouba SC players
Suwaiq Club players
Fanja SC players
Dhofar Club players
Al Nassr FC players
Al-Nahda Club (Oman) players
Sohar SC players
Oman Professional League players
Saudi Professional League players
Expatriate footballers in Saudi Arabia
Omani expatriate sportspeople in Saudi Arabia
2019 AFC Asian Cup players
FIFA Century Club